Redemption Hill was a New Zealand reality series that followed 10 teenagers identified as being likely to enter a life of crime. The teenagers were selected from a call for participants throughout New Zealand, many nominated by their parents 

Redemption Hill involved a course of discipline and adventure activities, as organised by a "warden" (Steve Boxer). It also involved time behind bars in Napier prison, which was decommissioned in 1993 and subsequently turned into a tourist attraction.

The show was filmed on location at Napier Prison, New Zealand's oldest prison.

Season one

The Teens
Aaron
Brigitte
Ebonee
Jesse
Jessica
Jeremy
Jonathon
Khelsie
Luke
Samantha

Updates
A year after the show was first broadcast, just before midnight on 20 April 2007, teen participant Aaron Mark Lambert was killed in a high-speed crash in his home town of Hamilton.

On the 28 July 2009, another show participant Jesse Young died following an accident where he was hit by a motor vehicle.

References

External links
 Napier Prison tourist web-site
 RedFlame Media New Zealand Production Company - Redemption Hill Show Page

New Zealand reality television series
TVNZ 2 original programming
Television series by Screentime